Sherlock Holmes and the Railway Maniac is a 1994 Sherlock Holmes pastiche novel by Barrie Roberts which pits Sherlock Holmes against an anarchist who is bombing trains.

The story involves real life incidents such as the siege of Sidney Street.

The events of the novel bookend the original Doyle story His Last Bow.

Reception

Eric Monahan called the book a "first rate pastiche" while Roger Johnson stated that Roberts "captures the Watson-Doyle style better than most".

References

1994 British novels
Sherlock Holmes novels
Sherlock Holmes pastiches
Constable & Co. books